The Cooper T80 was a Formula One racing car designed for the stillborn Climax FWMW 1.5 litre flat-16 engine. It was later converted to take a Maserati V12 as a test mule pending the arrival of the Cooper T81 chassis.

Development history
Cooper had prepared a chassis, designated T80, to take the Climax FWMW flat-16 1.5 litre engine for 1965 but the engine had suffered development problems and more importantly was no more powerful than the existing FWMV V8. Cooper then repurposed the chassis as a development mule for the Maserati Tipo 9 2.5-litre V12, enlarged to 3 litres. The Maserati engine would be used in Cooper's first purpose-built 3 litre Formula One car, the T81.

Race history
The T80 contested only a single race, the non-championship 1966 BRDC International Trophy. Jo Siffert's T81 suffered engine failure during practice and he drove the T80 in the race, retiring after 12 laps with clutch trouble.

References

Cooper Formula One cars
1966 Formula One season cars